Vertigo lilljeborgi is a species of minute land snail, a terrestrial pulmonate gastropod mollusk or micromollusk in the family Vertiginidae, the whorl snails.

Distribution
The type locality for this species is on the southern shore of Tresjön Lake, near Ronneby, Blekinge province, in Sweden.

This species is known to occur in a number of countries and islands in Northern Europe including:
 Great Britain, Wales, Scotland
 Ireland
 Denmark
 Germany
 Scandinavia: Sweden, ...
 Latvia
 and other areas

Shell description 
The shell is ventricose, ovate, strongly glossy, very finely striate, chestnut horn-color. The shell has 5 whorls, rather rapidly increasing, convex, the last but little higher than the penult, double as high as the next earlier whorl, a little ascending in front. Suture is slightly oblique.

Aperture is quite piriform, or obliquely cordate, with 1 parietal tooth (sometimes with another punctiform one), 2 columellar teeth, the lower very small, often wanting; 2 short, high, equal, immersed teeth 
in the palate, bounded by a reddish-brown streak in front. Peristome is weak, expanded, the margins delicately united; outer margin not impressed, scarcely produced angularly forward.

The width of the adult shell varies from 1.25 to 1.5 mm, the height from 2-2.25 mm.

Vertigo lilljeborgi, compared with Vertigo moulinsiana, is much smaller, more glossy, its whorls are more tumid, and its thinner lip lacks the broad, almost colorless margin of the latter.

References
This article incorporates public domain text from reference.

 Bank, R. A.; Neubert, E. (2017). Checklist of the land and freshwater Gastropoda of Europe. Last update: July 16th, 2017.

External links
 Vertigo lilljeborgi at AnimalBase
 ConchSoc info on identifying the species
 Westerlund, C. A. (1871). Exposé critique des mollusques de terre et d'eau douce de la Suède et de la Norvége. Nova Acta Societatis Regiae Scientiarum Upsaliensis. series 3, 8, 1 (1): 1–200. Uppsala (BERLING)

lilljeborgi
Gastropods described in 1871